Streptomyces cyaneus is an actinobacterium species in the genus Streptomyces.

S. cyaneus produces the alkylresorcinol adipostatin A (cardol). It also produces a chitinase A able to produce protoplasts from Schizophyllum commune cultured mycelia.

References

External links 

Type strain of Streptomyces cyaneus at BacDive -  the Bacterial Diversity Metadatabase

cyaneus
Bacteria described in 1941